Body Heat is a 1981 American neo-noir erotic thriller film written and directed by Lawrence Kasdan in his directorial debut. It stars William Hurt and Kathleen Turner, featuring Richard Crenna, Ted Danson, J. A. Preston and Mickey Rourke. The film was inspired by the classic film noir Double Indemnity (1944).

The film launched Turner's career—Empire magazine cited the film in 1995 when it named her one of the "100 Sexiest Stars in Film History". The New York Times wrote in 2005 that, propelled by her "jaw-dropping movie debut [in] Body Heat ... she built a career on adventurousness and frank sexuality born of robust physicality".

Plot

In the heat of a relentless summer, Ned Racine (William Hurt), an inept South Florida lawyer, meets and begins an affair with Matty Walker (Kathleen Turner). Matty's wealthy husband, Edmund, is always away on business during the week. Late one night, Ned arrives at the Walker mansion and, seeing Matty in the gazebo, playfully propositions her. The woman is actually Mary Ann Simpson, Matty's old high school friend who physically resembles her and who is briefly in town. Soon after, Matty tells Ned she wants a divorce, but a prenuptial agreement would leave her almost nothing. When she wishes Edmund was dead, Ned suggests murdering him so Matty can inherit his wealth. Ned consults a shady former client, Teddy Lewis (Mickey Rourke), an explosives expert, who provides Ned a small incendiary device though he advises Ned to abandon his plans.

After murdering Edmund, Ned and Matty move his body to an abandoned building that Edmund owns. Ned detonates the bomb to make it appear as if Edmund accidentally died during a botched arson attempt. Soon after, Edmund's lawyer contacts Ned about a new will that Ned supposedly drafted for Edmund and which was witnessed by Mary Ann Simpson. The new will was improperly prepared, making it null and void and results in Matty inheriting Edmund's entire fortune, while disinheriting his sister. Despite Ned's previous warning against making any estate changes, Matty had forged the new will, exploiting Ned's past malpractice issues, knowing it would be nullified and leaving her the sole beneficiary. Ned knows the police will consider the new will suspicious. A prominent plot point centers on a complicated and often misunderstood legal rule known as the rule against perpetuities.

Two of Ned's friends, assistant deputy prosecutor Peter Lowenstein and police detective Oscar Grace, suspect Ned may be involved in Edmund's death. Evidence includes Edmund's missing eyeglasses, which he always wore. On the night of the murder, hotel phone records show that repeated calls to Ned's room went unanswered, thereby weakening his alibi. Also, police are unable to locate Mary Ann Simpson.

Increasingly nervous over the mounting evidence and questioning Matty's loyalty, Ned happens upon a lawyer acquaintance who says he recommended Ned to Matty Walker. He admits telling her about Ned's limited legal skills. Later, Teddy tells Ned about a woman wanting an incendiary device, and says he showed her how to booby trap a door. Teddy also says the police have been asking him questions about the apparent arson.

Matty calls Ned and says that Edmund's glasses are in her boathouse. Ned arrives late that night and spots a wire attached to the boathouse door. Matty arrives, and, following a confrontation, Ned asks her to retrieve the glasses. Meanwhile, Oscar Grace arrives and observes their interaction. To prove herself, Matty walks toward the boathouse and disappears from view; the boathouse then explodes. A body found inside is identified as Matty Walker (née Tyler).

Now in prison, Ned, having realized Matty duped him, tries to convince Oscar Grace that she is still alive. He believes that "Matty" assumed the real Matty Tyler's identity in order to marry and murder Edmund. Ned surmises the "Mary Ann Simpson" that Ned previously met had discovered the scheme and was blackmailing Matty, only to be murdered and her body used to identify her as Edmund's wife. Had Ned been killed in the boathouse explosion as Matty likely intended, he reasons the police would have found both suspects' bodies.

In the epilogue, Ned, in prison, obtains a copy of Matty's high school yearbook: in it are photos of Mary Ann Simpson and Matty Tyler, confirming his suspicion that Mary Ann assumed Matty Walker's identity. Below Mary Ann's photo is the nickname "The Vamp" and "Ambition—To be rich and live in an exotic land".

In the final scene, the real Mary Ann (Matty) is seen lounging on a tropical beach. A man beside her makes a remark about the heat, and she acknowledges. She does not look happy.

Cast
 William Hurt as Ned Racine
 Kathleen Turner as Matty Tyler Walker
 Richard Crenna as Edmund Walker
 Ted Danson as Assistant Deputy Prosecutor Peter Lowenstein
 J. A. Preston as Detective Oscar Grace
 Mickey Rourke as Teddy Lewis
 Kim Zimmer as Mary Ann Simpson
 Jane Hallaren as Stella, The Waitress
 Lanna Saunders as Roz Kraft
 Carola McGuinness as Heather Kraft
 Michael Ryan as Miles Hardin

Production
Kasdan "wanted this film to have the intricate structure of a dream, the density of a good novel, and the texture of recognizable people in extraordinary circumstances." George Lucas acted as executive producer following successful collaborations with Kasdan as a scriptwriter on Raiders of the Lost Ark and The Empire Strikes Back.

A substantial portion of the film was shot in east-central Palm Beach County, Florida, including downtown Lake Worth and in the oceanside enclave of Manalapan. Additional scenes were shot on Hollywood Beach, Florida, such as the scene set in a band shell.

There was originally more graphic and extensive sex scene footage, but this was shown only in an early premiere, including in West Palm Beach, the area where it was filmed, and was later edited out for wider distribution. In an interview, Body Heat film editor Carol Littleton says, "Obviously, there was more graphic footage. But we felt that less was more."

Music
In late 1980, Lawrence Kasdan met with four composers whose works he had admired, but only John Barry presented ideas which were close to the director's own. 10 demos were recorded on March 31 and Barry wrote the whole score during April and early May 1981. The composer provided several themes and leitmotifs—the most memorable was "Main Theme", heard during the main titles and representing Matty.

Barry worked closely with recording sessions engineer Dan Wallin to mix the soundtrack album, but for several reasons J.S Lasher (who produced the limited-edition LP and CD) remixed multitracks himself without Barry's or Wallin's participation.

J.S Lasher's album was released several times: as a 45 RPM (Southern Cross LXSE 1.002) in 1983 and as a CD (Label X LXCD 2) in 1989. Both editions also included 'Ladd Company Logo' composed and conducted by John Williams.

In 1998, Varèse Sarabande released a re-recording by Joel McNeely and the London Symphony Orchestra. This CD contained several new tracks (versus J.S Lasher's editions), but still was not complete.

In August 2012, Film Score Monthly released a definitive two-disc edition: the complete score with alternate, unused, and source cues on disc 1, and the original, Barry-authorized album and theme demos on disc 2.

Reception

Box office
Body Heat was a commercial success. Produced on a budget of $9 million, it grossed $24 million at the domestic box office.

Critical response
Upon its release, Richard Corliss wrote "Body Heat has more narrative drive, character congestion and sense of place than any original screenplay since Chinatown, yet it leaves room for some splendid young actors to breathe, to collaborate in creating the film's texture"; it is "full of meaty characters and pungent performances—Ted Danson as a tap-dancing prosecutor, J.A. Preston as a dogged detective, and especially Mickey Rourke as a savvy young ex-con who looks and acts as if he could be Ned's sleazier twin brother." Variety magazine wrote "Body Heat is an engrossing, mightily stylish meller [melodrama] in which sex and crime walk hand-in-hand down the path to tragedy, just like in the old days. Working in the imposing shadow of the late James M. Cain, screenwriter Lawrence Kasdan makes an impressively confident directorial debut". Roger Ebert included the film on his "10 Best List" for the year.

Janet Maslin wrote that Body Heat was "skillfully, though slavishly, derived" from 1940s film noir classics; she stated that, "Mr. Hurt does a wonderful job of bringing Ned to life," but was not impressed by Turner's performance:Sex is all-important to Body Heat, as its title may indicate. And beyond that there isn't much to move the story along or to draw these characters together. A great deal of the distance between [Ned and Matty] can be attributed to the performance of Miss Turner, who looks like the quintessential forties siren, but sounds like the soap-opera actress she is. Miss Turner keeps her chin high in the air, speaks in a perfect monotone, and never seems to move from the position in which Mr. Kasdan has left her.

Pauline Kael dismissed the film, citing its "insinuating, hotted-up dialogue that it would be fun to hoot at if only the hushed, sleepwalking manner of the film didn't make you cringe or yawn". Ebert responded to Kael's negative review when he added the film to his "Great Movies" list: Yes, Lawrence Kasdan's Body Heat (1981) is aware of the films that inspired it—especially Billy Wilder's Double Indemnity (1944). But it has a power that transcends its sources. It exploits the personal style of its stars to insinuate itself; Kael is unfair to Turner, who in her debut role played a woman so sexually confident that we can believe her lover (William Hurt) could be dazed into doing almost anything for her. The moment we believe that, the movie stops being an exercise and starts working.

John Simon of the National Review described Body Heat as 'derivative and odious'.

In a home video review for Turner Classic Movies, Glenn Erickson called it "arguably the first conscious Neo Noir"; he wrote "Too often described as a quickie remake of Double Indemnity, Body Heat is more detailed in structure and more pessimistic about human nature. The noir hero for the Reagan years is ...more like the self-defeating Al Roberts of Edgar Ulmer's Detour". Body Heat received mostly positive reviews from critics. Rotten Tomatoes gives the film a 96% approval rating based on 47 reviews, and an average rating of 8.10/10. The site's consensus states, "Made from classic noir ingredients and flavored with a heaping helping of steamy modern spice, Body Heat more than lives up to its evocative title."

The film is recognized by American Film Institute in these lists:
 2001: AFI's 100 Years...100 Thrills – No. 92
 2002: AFI's 100 Years...100 Passions – No. 94
 2005: AFI's 100 Years...100 Movie Quotes:
 Matty Walker: "You aren't too bright. I like that in a man." – Nominated
 2005: AFI's 100 Years of Film Scores – Nominated

Rourke earned critical acclaim for his performance, which helped him evolve from character actor to movie star.

Home media
Warner Bros. released a 25th-anniversary Deluxe Edition DVD of Body Heat, including a documentary about the film by Laurent Bouzereau, a "number of rightfully deleted scenes", and a trailer.

References
Notes

External links

 
 
 
 
 

1981 films
1980s erotic thriller films
1980s mystery thriller films
American erotic thriller films
American mystery thriller films
American neo-noir films
1980s English-language films
Erotic mystery films
Films about adultery in the United States
Films directed by Lawrence Kasdan
Films scored by John Barry (composer)
Films set in Florida
Films shot in Florida
Films shot in Hawaii
The Ladd Company films
Warner Bros. films
1981 directorial debut films
1980s American films